Judge Newman may refer to:

Alfred Newman (judge) (1834–1898), judge of the Wisconsin Circuit Court and the Wisconsin Supreme Court
Bernard Newman (judge) (1907–1999), judge of the United States Court of International Trade
Charles Newman (judge), British judge and member of the Judicial Appointments Commission
Clifton Newman (born 1951), judge of the South Carolina Circuit court
Jon O. Newman (born 1932), judge of the United States Court of Appeals for the Second Circuit
Jonathan Uhry Newman (1927–1991), judge of the Oregon Court of Appeals
Michael J. Newman (born 1960), judge of the United States District Court for the Southern District of Ohio
Pauline Newman (born 1927), judge of the United States Court of Appeals for the Federal Circuit
Theodore R. Newman Jr. (born 1934), first black chief judge of the District of Columbia Court of Appeals
William Truslow Newman (1843–1920), judge of the United States District Court for the Northern District of Georgia

See also
Justice Newman (disambiguation)